Egyptian is an American indie rock duo band and the side project of formerly married singers Dan Reynolds and Aja Volkman.

Formation
Invited to perform an opening set for Nico Vega, Dan Reynolds met Aja Volkman in 2010.  He invited her to help him finish some demos he was working on.  The two began a collaborative process which they titled Egyptian.  They recorded, produced, and released independently a four track eponymous EP digitally.  Their other bands Imagine Dragons and Nico Vega have also toured together in 2011, 2013 and 2014.

Discography

EPs
Egyptian – EP (2011)

Also featured on
Answers to Nothing (soundtrack) (2011) – "Fade"

Music videos

References

External links
 

Indie rock musical groups from Nevada
Musical groups established in 2010
Musical groups from Las Vegas
Male–female musical duos
Married couples
2010 establishments in Nevada